A Love Song for Bobby Long is a 2004 American psychological drama film directed and written by Shainee Gabel, based on the novel Off Magazine Street by Ronald Everett Capps. It stars  John Travolta as the title character, an aging alcoholic, and Scarlett Johansson as a headstrong young woman who returns to New Orleans, Louisiana after her estranged mother's death.

The film had its world premiere at the 61st Venice International Film Festival on September 2, 2004. It began a limited release in the United States on December 29, 2004, followed by a wide release on January 21, 2005, by Lions Gate Films. Johansson received her third Golden Globe Award nomination for her performance.

Plot
After her mother Lorraine, a jazz singer whom she felt neglected her for her career, dies from a drug overdose, 18-year-old Purslane “Pursy” Hominy Will leaves a Florida trailer park, where she lives with an abusive boyfriend, to return to her hometown of New Orleans, after having dropped out of high school and left the city.

She is surprised to find strangers living in her mother's dilapidated home: Bobby Long, a former professor of literature at Auburn University, and his protégé and former teaching assistant, Lawson Pines, a struggling writer. Both heavy drinkers and smokers, they pass time quoting poets, playing chess, and spending time with the neighbors; Long also sings country-folk songs. The two convince Pursy that her mother left the house to all three of them. More exactly, the truth is that Pursy is the sole heir, and her mother's will limits how long the other two can stay in the house.

Pursy moves in, acting as the most responsible member of the evolving dysfunctional family. The men's efforts to drive her away decline as they grow more fond of her. Bobby - slovenly and suffering from ailments he prefers to ignore - tries to improve Pursy by introducing her to the novel The Heart Is a Lonely Hunter; he also encourages her to return to high school and get her degree. Lawson is attracted to her but hesitates to become involved. The three have memories of Lorraine, especially Pursy, who feels that her mother ignored her to pursue her jazz career. When she finds a cache of letters her mother wrote to her but never mailed, Pursy learns more about how Lorraine felt about her, and the identity of her biological father.

Cast
John Travolta as Bobby Long 
Scarlett Johansson as Purslan "Pursy" Hominy Will
Gabriel Macht as Lawson Pines 
Deborah Kara Unger as Georgianna 
Clayne Crawford as Lee
Sonny Shroyer as Earl
Carol Sutton as Ruthie
Warren Kole as Sean (as Warren Blosjo)
Nick Loren as Merchant

Production 
According to the film credits, it was shot on location in New Orleans and Gretna, Louisiana.

Soundtrack 
The soundtrack includes "Someday" by Los Lobos, "Bone" by Thalia Zedek, "Lonesome Blues" by Lonnie Pitchford, "Different Stars" and "Lie in the Sound" by Trespassers William, "All I Ask is Your Love" by Helen Humes, "Rising Son" by Big Bill Morganfield, "Praying Ground Blues" by Lightnin' Hopkins, and "Blonde on Blonde" by Nada Surf. John Travolta sings two tracks—"Barbara Allen" and “I Really Don’t Want to Know". The title track, "A Love Song For Bobby Long," is by Grayson Capps, the son of Ronald Everett Capps. The senior Capps wrote the novel that was adapted for the film.

Release 
The film premiered at the Venice Film Festival in September 2004. In order to qualify for Academy Awards consideration, it opened on eight screens in New York City and Los Angeles on December 29, 2004, earning $28,243 on its opening weekend. It played in 24 theaters in the US at its widest release. It eventually grossed $164,308 domestically and $1,676,952 in foreign markets for a total worldwide box office of $1,841,260.

Critical reception
Stephen Holden of The New York Times wrote "[I]t dawdles along aimlessly for nearly two hours before coming up with a final revelation that is no surprise." He felt John Travolta was playing "a hammed-up, scenery-chewing variation of the brainy good ol' boy he played in Primary Colors," and thought Gabriel Macht's "understated performance" was "the deepest and subtlest of the three."

Roger Ebert of the Chicago Sun-Times wrote "What can be said is that the three actors inhabit this material with ease and gratitude: It is good to act on a simmer sometimes, instead of at a fast boil. It's unusual to find an American movie that takes its time. It's remarkable to listen to dialogue that assumes the audience is well-read. It is refreshing to hear literate conversation. These are modest pleasures, but real enough."

Carina Chocano of the Los Angeles Times wrote that the film 
is, deep-down, a redemptive makeover story drenched in alcohol, Southern literature and the damp romanticism of the bohemian lush life in New Orleans. A lovely noble rot pervades the film in much the same way that it does the city, a longtime repository of lost-cause romanticism. If there's something a little bit moldy about the setup (drunken literary types, hope on the doorstep, healing from beyond the grave), the movie is no less charming or involving for it, and it's no less pleasant to succumb to its wayward allure and wastrel lyricism. Among other things, the characters . . . really know how to turn a phrase, in itself a pleasure so rare it all but demands any flaws be forgiven.

Peter Travers of Rolling Stone rated the film two out of four stars, calling it "an elegant mess." He added "The actors labor to perform a rescue operation...It's the stunning location photography of camera ace Elliot Davis that provides what the movie itself lacks: authenticity."

Awards and nominations

DVD release
The DVD was released in anamorphic widescreen format on April 19, 2005. It has audio tracks and subtitles in English, French, and Portuguese. Bonus features include commentary with screenwriter/director Shainee Gabel and cinematographer Elliot Davis, deleted scenes, and Behind the Scenes of A Love Song for Bobby Long with cast and crew interviews.

References

External links
 
 
 
 

2004 films
2004 drama films
2000s English-language films
2000s psychological drama films
American psychological drama films
Films about alcoholism
Films about writers
Films based on American novels
Films set in New Orleans
Films shot in New Orleans
Destination Films films
Lionsgate films
Southern Gothic films
2000s American films